Obrnice is a municipality and village in Most District in the Ústí nad Labem Region of the Czech Republic. It has about 2,000 inhabitants.

Administrative parts
Villages of České Zlatníky and Chanov are administrative parts of Obrnice.

Notable people
Florence Marly (1919–1978), actress

References

Villages in Most District